Bijoor  is a Village near to Byndoor in the southern state of Karnataka, India. It is located in the Byndoor taluk of Udupi district in Karnataka.Bijur Gram Panchayat consists of a single village consisting of 4 broad wards. The village is bounded by the town of Byndoor to the north, Kergalu to the south, Kaltodu to the east and Uppunda village to the west. Bijoor village is  located in 6 km from the taluk center and Hobali. The village has one high school, four higher primary schools and one private Shri Vivekananda English Medium School  that provides high-quality education.

Demographics
As of 2001 India census, Bijoor had a population of 5791 with 2513 males and 3278 females. Bijoor has a small halt railway station on the Konkan Railway Line.

See also
Byndoor
 Udupi
 Districts of Karnataka

References

External links
 http://Udupi.nic.in/

Villages in Udupi district